Swadeshabhimani means The Patriot in Indian languages and may also refer to:

 Swadeshabhimani (newspaper), a newspaper
 Swadeshabhimani Ramakrishna Pillai, the editor of the newspaper
 Vakkom Moulavi, the publisher of Swadeshabhimani